Jesse John Hibbs (January 11, 1906 – February 4, 1985) was an American film and television director and American football player. He played college football at the University of Southern California (USC), where he was an All-American tackle for the Trojans in 1927 and 1928.

Football career
Born in Normal, Illinois, Hibbs graduated from the select Lake Forest Academy and subsequently enrolled at the University of Southern California (USC), where he was the captain of USC's first national championship team, in 1928. Among his 1926 teammates was Marion Morrison, later known as John Wayne.

Hibbs played professionally in the National Football League (NFL) with the Chicago Bears in 1931.

Hollywood
Like several other USC players of the 1920s and 1930s, including Wayne, Ward Bond, Cotton Warburton and Aaron Rosenberg, Hibbs entered the film industry and became an assistant director. He got his first opportunity to direct in 1953, on the Tony Curtis football drama The All American. He went on to work primarily in westerns; seven of his eleven features were within the genre, along with much of his television work. He also worked regularly with Audie Murphy – on the westerns Ride Clear of Diablo, Walk the Proud Land, and Ride a Crooked Trail, as well as the film version of Murphy's life story To Hell and Back, the boxing film World in My Corner, Shining Victory, and Joe Butterfly.

In later years Hibbs switched worked mainly in television, directing 43 episodes of Perry Mason, 28 episodes of The F.B.I., 20 episodes of Gunsmoke as well as multiple episodes of several other TV series.

Death and honors
Hibbs died at age 79 in Ojai, California. He was inducted into the USC Athletic Hall of Fame in 1999.

References

External links
 

1906 births
1985 deaths
American football tackles
American television directors
Chicago Bears players
USC Trojans football players
All-American college football players
Lake Forest Academy alumni
People from Normal, Illinois
Players of American football from Illinois
Film directors from Illinois